Mt. Zion is a 2013 New Zealand film written and directed by Tearepa Kahi, starring Stan Walker and Temuera Morrison. This film marks the acting debut for singer Stan Walker.  The world premiere of the film was held at the Event Cinema at Manukau on 4 February 2013.

Plot
Turei's family are hard-working potato farm workers in rural New Zealand. A talented musician, Turei dreams of his band being the support act for Bob Marley's 1979 tour. But it's a dream that challenges the traditions and values of his upbringing and will set him at odds with his family – particularly his father, a true man of the land.

Cast
Stan Walker as Turei
Temuera Morrison as Dad
Miriama Smith as Layla
Darcy Ray Flavell-Hudson		
Will Hall		
Kevin Kaukau as Booker
Troy Kingi
Graham Ryan
David Wikaira-Paul

Production
The movie was filmed in Pukekohe.

Reception
Russell Baillie from New Zealand Herald gave the film 4/5 saying it is a smart, finely-observed, heartfelt drama of good humour and decent tunes against an authentic local setting.
 Jake Wilson from Sydney Morning Herald gave it  stars saying the film doesn't have the charm or skill for a big feelgood success and 'Walker only relaxes when he sings'.

Soundtrack
The soundtrack was released on 15 March 2013.

Also included on the album are six original recordings from Small Axe (the fictional band depicted in the film), a host of reggae classics from 10cc, Peter Tosh, Third World, Jimmy Cliff, Toots and the Maytals, as well as hits from iconic Kiwi artists Prince Tui Teka, Max Merritt & The Meteors, and Herbs.

Track listing
"Take It Easy" – Stan Walker
"Mt Zion" – Small Axe
"Heat Wave" – Small Axe
"Dreadlock Holiday" – 10cc
"(You Gotta Walk) Don't Look Back" – Peter Tosh
"Now That We Found Love" – Third World
"The Harder They Come" – Jimmy Cliff
"Funky Kingston" – Toots and the Maytals
"Marcus Garvey" – Burning Spear
"I Can See Clearly Now" – Johnny Nash
"Hoki Mai" – Prince Tui Teka
"Soul Deep" – Small Axe
"Lion Trail" – Small Axe featuring Troy Kingi
"Maunga Hiona" – Small Axe featuring Che-fu
"Azania (Soon Come)" – Herbs
"I Need Your Love" – Golden Harvest
"Slippin' Away" – Max Merritt & The Meteors
"Army" – Small Axe
"Basket" – Small Axe

Weekly charts
In New Zealand the album debuted at #11, before peaking at #1 on 18 February 2013.

References

External links
 Trailer hosted a New Zealand Herald

2013 films
2013 drama films
New Zealand drama films
Australian drama films
Cultural depictions of Bob Marley